This is a list of seasons completed by the Western Carolina Catamounts football team. Representing Western Carolina University in Cullowhee, North Carolina, the Catamounts compete in the Southern Conference in the NCAA Division I FCS. The school began playing football in 1931, and plays their home games out of 13,742-seat Bob Waters Field at E. J. Whitmire Stadium. The Catamounts are currently led by head coach Kerwin Bell.

The Catamounts' first and currently only conference championship came in 1949 where they went 8–3 and participated in the now-defunct Smoky Mountain Bowl. The program made an appearance in the 1983 NCAA Division I-AA national championship game, winning three games before falling to Southern Illinois in the championship game. The 1983 campaign was the winningest season in program history with an 11–3–1 record.

Seasons

Notes

References

Western Carolina

Western Carolina Catamounts football seasons